Chiara Tilesi is an Italian film producer and founder of "We Do It Together", a non-profit film production company based in Los Angeles.
 
Chiara Tilesi moved to the United States when she was eighteen, to attend Loyola Marymount University Los Angeles, California, where, in 1995 she graduated cum laude in liberal arts. In her early years she wrote a book of poetry entitled "Amore amore mio", which earned her the Fiorino D'Oro Award. She produced the Behind the Scenes of the Academy Award winner movie "Il Postino", and won Best Story and Narration Award at the International Backstage Festival of Bologna. In 1995 she produced a short film entitled "I'm Sophie and You?" The film won various awards, and was acquired and broadcast by the Italian national network RAI Television. In 1997 Chiara returned to Italy to produce the compact disc "Nei Tuoi Occhi", as a tribute to Massimo Troisi. The CD, a collection of love poems by the poet Pablo Neruda read by famous Italian artists, eventually enjoyed great commercial success and critical acclaim. In 1998 Chiara produced the short film entitled "Effetto Lunare", (What about the Moon?). 2001 saw her production of the short film "Strani Accordi", coproduced and distributed by Universal. The film was released in 100 theaters in Italy. She was the producer of the 2005 the movie All the Invisible Children which premiered at the Venice Film Festival.

She was invited to participate as a Cultural Leader and official speaker to the World Economic Forum Annual Meeting, held in Davos, Switzerland. Chiara presented her inspirational speech at the Betazone "The Female Icon", on the disruption of the paradigm and how women's narratives can change, joining other industry leaders and cultural figures like WDIT board member Aifaa Al-Mansour, Marin Alsop, Sir David Attenborough, Bono, David Blaine, Karan Johar, Michelle Yeoh, and more in an effort to advance a dialogue discussing how inclusivity and sustainability can be the pillars of change.

Chiara has also held speeches at TED X WOMEN, at the UN and Cannes, to name a few, to spread the message of gender equality. Chiara's first feature film, All the Invisible Children, was produced for UNICEF and the World Food Program, with a release in 120 countries and the co-direction of Ridley Scott, John Woo and Spike Lee among others.

She was appointed Director of Social Impact Department as well as Director and Creator of ISFF (Impact short Film Festival) of TaTaTu, a blockchain-based social entertainment platform.

In 2011 she produced a documentary film about the life of Franco Califano "We, People of September", which was selected for the Rome Film Festival.

Chiara Tilesi is a Board of Director member of L-Nutra, the leading nutri-technology company developing an innovative portfolio of Fasting Mimicking Diets FMD', founded by Valter Longo, director of the USC Longevity Institute and The Program on Longevity and Cancer at IFOM in Milan. Chiara and Longo are co-producers of the documentary The Longevity Revolution.

She is the founder of Globunity, a global cultural event and digital media platform that focuses on creativity and arts.

She holds the position of Event Vice Chair of Rock the Kasbah – a non-profit foundation of Sir Richard Branson's Virgin Group, a member of the UNICEF Chinese Children's Initiative Advisory board, and on the board of directors for Children Mending Hearts, a nonprofit organization. Chiara Tilesi was named an Ambassador for the 2019 edition of Monaco Better World Forum (MBWF) by MBWF's founder and president Manuel Collas de La Roche.

Tell It Like A Woman 
Starting in 2020, Tilesi Produced "Tell It Like A Woman" an anthology film alongside producers Andrea Iervolino, Lady Monika Bacardi, and Lucas Akoskin, and executive producers Jennifer Ryan and Carol Polakoff. Samuel Goldwyn Films has acquired U.S. distribution rights to star-studded female-powered feature Tell It Like A Woman, whose filmmakers and actors include Taraji P. Henson, Jennifer Hudson, Pauletta Washington, Cara Delevingne, Catherine Hardwicke, Margherita Buy, Marcia Gay Harden, Eva Longoria, Leonor Varela, Jacqueline Fernandez, Anne Watanabe and Mipo O. In June of 2022, the film premiered at the Taormina Film Festival where it won the TFF Excellence Award. 

 

Sofia Carson and Diane Warren performed "Applause" - the 'Tell It Like A Woman' theme song at the Taormina Film Festival.  

For the film, superstar songwriter and 13-time Oscar nominee Diane Warren (who is getting an honorary Academy Award in November) has written original song Applause which was performed by Sofia Carson and is being released later this year as a single through Disney Music Group label Hollywood Records. An accompanying music video was directed by Catherine Hardwicke, starring singer and actress Carson.

The nonprofit film production company We Do It Together was the engine behind the film 'Tell It Like A Woman'.

One Of Us 
On March 8, 2022, International Women's Day, "One Of Us" Season 2 was released in Washington DC. The East Coast episode of the limited series that Chiara Directed was premiered at the Italian Embassy in Washington DC in the presence of Speaker Nancy Pelosi and the Ukrainian Ambassador to Washington, Oksana Markarova. Talent Included Isabella Rossellini, Ambassador Mariangela Zappia, Natalia Bergamaschi, Cecilia Alemani, Cristina Cassetti. The West Coast Episode was premiered two days later at Mr. Brainwash Art Museum in Los Angeles and included the talent Giada De Laurentiis, Raffaella Camera, Federica Raia, Gabriella Pession. "One Of Us" Season 2 was recognized at the 2022 Los Angeles, Italia, Film, Fashion, and Art Fest where both Chiara Tilesi and Actress Gabriella Pession took home an LA ITALIA - EXCELLENCE AWARD for their representation of women in film and TV. The series is available to watch on the Embassy of Italy's YouTube Channel and Consulate General YouTube Channel.

Giving Back Generation 
Chiara is presently in post production for Giving Back Generation seasons 2 and 3, a social impact vodcast featuring influencers like actress Selena Gomez, former Hindu monk and life coach Jay Shetty, radio personality Tanya Rad, actress Leonor Varela, celebrity chef Serena Poon, Italian singer Leo Gassmann, and many others.

References

Loyola Marymount University alumni
Italian film producers